Wallendorf is an Ortsteil (subdivision) of the Lichte municipality. It is located in the district of Saalfeld-Rudolstadt in Thuringia, Germany, close to the Thuringian Rennsteig.

Geography 
Th Ortsteil Wallendorf, consisting of the villages Wallendorf and Lamprecht, is located in a forested area in the southern part of the Thuringian Forest.

History 
The documentary first mention of Wallendorf was dated December 29, 1414. Lamprecht as part of Wallendorf was first mentioned in a document December 21, 1386.

The baroque Elisabeth's church, built until 1734, was sponsored by Peter Hohmann and his descendants. The Hohmann family was also owner of the Manor Wallendorf. The so-called Gutshof (manor house) and Fronwiese (lord's meadow) are indications of that historical period.

See also 
 Lichtetal am Rennsteig
 Lichte
 Cultural monuments in Lichte
 Wallendorfer Porzellan
 Lichte (river)

External links 

 Homepage of the Municipal Association (Verwaltungsgemeinschaft)

References 

Lichte
Villages in Thuringia
Saalfeld-Rudolstadt